The women's 1500 metres at the 2018 European Athletics Championships takes place at the Olympic Stadium on 10 and 12 August.

Records

Schedule

Results

Round 1

First 4 (Q) and next 4 fastest (q) qualify for the final.

Final

References

1500 W
1500 metres at the European Athletics Championships
Euro